The events surrounding the 2003 invasion of Iraq have led to numerous expressions of opinion with respect to the war. This article contains links to several topics relating to views on the invasion, and the subsequent occupation of Iraq.

American views
 American popular opinion on invasion of Iraq: Opinion poll views and history.

World views
 Governmental positions on the Iraq War prior to the 2003 invasion of Iraq: Summary of various governments' pre-war positions.
 The UN Security Council and the Iraq war: Examines positions of UN Security Council members over the period 2002–2003

Opposition views
 Opposition to the Iraq War: Various opinions of people against the Iraq War.
 Protests against the Iraq War: Protests against Iraq war across the world.
 Criticism of the Iraq War: Various criticisms of the Iraq War.

Other views
 Public relations preparations for 2003 invasion of Iraq: Various communication campaigns identified that inform (or influence) the public.
 Legitimacy of the 2003 invasion of Iraq
 Legality of the Iraq War
 Iraq Inquiry or Chilcot Inquiry: a British public inquiry into its role in the war.

Stances and opinions regarding the Iraq War
2003 invasion of Iraq